Cusgarne is a village in Cornwall, England, UK. It is in the civil parish of Gwennap

Cusgarne Community Primary School is in the centre of the village. It caters for children from the ages of 4–11 with the majority moving on to nearby Penryn College or either Richard Lander or Penair schools.

The name Cusgarne comes from the Cornish language words koos, meaning 'wood', and garan, meaning 'heron' or 'crane'.

References

External links

Villages in Cornwall